Karna is one of the central characters of the Hindu epic Mahābhārata. Alternative transliterations include Karnaa, Karnan and Karn. 

Karna may also refer to:

People 
 Karna (Kalachuri dynasty) (r. c. 1041-1073 CE), Indian king
 Karna (Chaulukya dynasty) (r. c. 1064–1092 CE), Indian king
 Karna (Vaghela dynasty) (r. c. 1296 – c. 1304), Indian king
 Karna Lidmar-Bergström (born 1940), Swedish geomorphologist

Films 
Karnan (1964 film), an Indian Tamil language film starring Sivaji Ganesan
Karna (1986 film), an Indian Kannada language film
Karnaa, a 1995 film Indian Tamil language film starring Arjun
Karnan (2021 film), an Indian Tamil language film starring Dhanush

Places 

Karnal, a city in Haryana, India
Karna, Iran, in West Azerbaijan Province, Iran
Karna, Poland
Karná, a village in the Humenne District of Slovakia
Kärna, a locality in Kungälv Municipality, Sweden
Kärnan, a medieval tower in southern Sweden
Karna, a former name of Saada, Yemen

Other uses
 Karna, an Iranian musical instrument in Persian traditional music
 Karna (Talmud), a Jewish Amora sage of Babylonia
 The common name of Platysace cirrosa, a Western Australian herb

See also

 Karma (disambiguation)
 Karnan (disambiguation)
 Karra (disambiguation)